Julius Ceaser Osley (May 15, 1915 – January 1968) was an American Negro league pitcher in the 1930s.

A native of Acmar, Alabama, Osley played for the Birmingham Black Barons in 1937 and 1938. In his nine recorded appearances, he yielded eight earned runs in 22.1 innings on the mound. Osley died in 1968 at age 52.

References

External links
 and Seamheads

1915 births
1968 deaths
Date of death missing
Place of death missing
Birmingham Black Barons players
Baseball pitchers
Baseball players from Alabama
People from St. Clair County, Alabama
20th-century African-American sportspeople